Nemophas websteri is a species of beetle in the family Cerambycidae. It was described by Karl Jordan in 1898.

References

nigriceps
Beetles described in 1898